The 2006 Moscow market bombing occurred on August 21, 2006, when a self-made bomb with power of more than 1kg of TNT exploded at Moscow's Cherkizovsky Market, frequented by foreign merchants.  In 2008, eight members of the racialist organization The Saviour (Спас) were sentenced for their roles in the attack.

Many traders at the market are from Asia and the Caucasus. As of October 3, 2006, 13 persons were confirmed dead: six citizens of Tajikistan, three citizens of Uzbekistan, two citizens of Russia, a citizen of Belarus, and a citizen of China. Eight people died at the scene, two in the hospital on the same day as the bombing, and three at a later date. The last person to die from the bombing was a man who was a citizen of Tajikistan, who died on September 28, 2006, in a hospital.

Perpetrators and prosecutions 
Two ethnic Russian suspects were arrested, and the general prosecutor of Moscow Yuri Syomin charged them with a racially motivated murder. The prosecutor's office officially indicted three university students, Oleg Kostyrev, Ilya Tikhomirov (both 20 years old) and Valeri Zhukovtsev (18 years old) on a racially motivated murder charge on August 22.

According to the investigation, Kostyrev, Tikhomirov and Zhukovtsev were members of the nationalistic club The Saviour. The leader of the club, Nikolay Korolyov, and two more club members, Sergei Klimuk (a former FSB officer) and police academy student Nikita Senyukov, were co-indicted with Kostyrev, Tikhomirov and Zhukovtsev on the charges of murder, terrorism, organizing a criminal gang and illegal production and storage of explosives. Senyukov was also indicted for murder of an Armenian student on a subway. Allegedly, the conspirators have performed numerous explosions before, without any victims, blowing up Azerbaijani-owned stores, an Armenian refugee hostel and an office of a Georgian-born fortune teller.

On May 15, 2008, after a guilty verdict in the jury trial, Korolyov, Klimuk, Tikhomirov and Kostyrev received a sentence of life imprisonment. Zhukovtsev received 20 years in prison, Senyukov 13 years and the two students who actually delivered the bomb to the market, Dmitri Fedoseyenkov and Nikolai Kachalov only 2 years (the court decided they were not a part of the "criminal enterprise"). Later the same month, an appeal was filed with the Supreme Court by the convicted. Fedoseyenkov and Kachalov were released from prison on March 20, 2009 after serving their sentence. Other convict's appeals were still underway as of that time.

In August 2010, it was announced that Korolyov and Kostyrev were also suspects in the murder of a Chinese citizen by stabbing in Moscow on May 19, 2006.

References 

21st-century mass murder in Russia
Anti-Asian sentiment in Russia
Anti-Caucasus sentiment in Russia
Anti–Central Asian sentiment in Russia
Attacks in Russia in 2006
Hate crimes
Central Asian diaspora in Russia
Mass murder in 2006
Events in Moscow
Anti-Muslim violence in Europe
Improvised explosive device bombings in Russia
Terrorist incidents in Russia in 2006
Racism in Russia
Neo-fascist terrorist incidents
August 2006 events in Russia
2006 in Moscow
2006 murders in Russia
Marketplace attacks